Xavier Ehrenbert Fridelli (11 March 1673 – 4 June 1743) was an Austrian Jesuit missionary and cartographer in China.

Life
Born at Linz, Austria, Fridelli entered the Society of Jesus in 1688 and in 1705 arrived in China. Fridelli was an important contributor to the cartographical survey of the Chinese empire, begun in 1708 and completed in 1718 (according to others, 1715).

Baron Richthofen says this is "the most comprehensive cartographic feat ever performed in so short a space of time. Together with Jean-Baptiste Régis, Pierre Jartoux, and others, he designed the maps of Chi-li, the Amur district, Khalkas (Mongolia), Sze-ch'wan, Yun-nan, Kwei-chou, and Hu-kwang (Hu-nan and Hu-pe), for which purpose the traversed the whole empire from south to north. At the time of his death, Fridelli had been rector for many years of the Southern or Portuguese church (Nan-t'ang), one of the four Jesuit churches at Beijing, where he died. He was buried in the Jesuits' Zhalan Cemetery in Beijing.

References 

 Attribution
  The entry cites:
 Five letters in N. Welt-Bott (Augsbirg, 1726, and Vienna, 1758), nos. 103, 106, 194, 589, 674;
 MSS report in the Vienna state library, no, 1117;
 Du Halde,  Description de l'Empire de la Chine (the Hague, 1736), I, preface, p. xxxviii;
 Huonder, Deutsche Jesuitenmissionäre (Freiburg im Br., 1899), 87, 186

1673 births
1743 deaths
18th-century Austrian Jesuits
Austrian Roman Catholic missionaries
Roman Catholic missionaries in China
Austrian expatriates in China
Clergy from Linz
17th-century Austrian Jesuits
Austrian cartographers